Colombey-les-Deux-Églises (literally Colombey the Two Churches) is a commune in the Haute-Marne department in north-eastern France. It is best known as the home of Charles de Gaulle.

The municipality of Colombey-les-Deux-Églises was created administratively in 1793, and it became part of the district of Chaumont and the canton of Blaise. In 1801, under the name Colombey, it passed to the canton Juzennecourt. In 1972, it absorbed the communes Argentolles, Biernes, Blaise, Champcourt, Harricourt, Pratz and Lavilleneuve-aux-Fresnes. On 1 January 2017, the former commune of Lamothe-en-Blaisy was merged into Colombey-les-Deux-Églises.

Charles de Gaulle

Colombey achieved fame as the home and burial site of the 20th-century soldier and statesman Charles de Gaulle, who acquired a substantial property on the southwestern edge of the village in 1934. De Gaulle withdrew repeatedly to Colombey when his political fortunes waned, first on the establishment of the Fourth Republic in 1946, and then between 1953 and 1958, before he became president again at the height of the Algerian Crisis. His final withdrawal to Colombey came in 1969 and he died there the following year. "Colombey" became widely used as a political metaphor for a statesman's temporary withdrawal from political life until his country came calling for him again.

De Gaulle is buried in the cemetery in Colombey, in a humble grave with the inscription "Charles de Gaulle 1890-1970". In addition, a 145 ft (44.3 m) high Cross of Lorraine was built at the western exit of the village, commemorating his distinguished wartime role as commander of the Free French Forces. A memorial museum was inaugurated in October 2008 by Nicolas Sarkozy and Angela Merkel. This joint Franco-German act marked the fiftieth anniversary of talks in Colombey on 14 September 1958 between Charles de Gaulle and Konrad Adenauer, as part of the process of post-war reconciliation.

Geography
The River Blaise flows through the commune.

See also
Communes of the Haute-Marne department

References

External links

 Official website, Colombey-les-Deux-Églises
 Official website, Mémorial Charles de Gaulle
 Mémorial Charles de Gaulle and other connected exhibitions 

Colombeylesdeuxeglises
Populated places established in 1793